Fe y Alegría is a federation of local organizations which offer educational opportunities to the poorest sectors of society, along with teacher training and educational radio, in 19 countries. From its main office in Bogota, Colombia, Fe y Alegría advances the tradition of Jesuit education under an international board of directors.

History 
Fe y Alegría was founded in Caracas, Venezuela, in 1955 by José María Vélaz. It spread rapidly in Venezuela, where it encompassed 10,000 students by 1964. By 1966 Ecuador, Panama, Peru, Bolivia, Central America, and Colombia were a part of the network.

References

Further reading
J. Swope and M. Latorre. Comunidades Educativas donde Termina el Asfalto: Escuelas Fe y Alegria en America Latina. Santiago, Chile: CIDE, 1998.
L. Alcazar and N. Valdivia. Escuelas Fe y Alegria en el Peru. Lima: Grupo de Analisis para el Desarrollo, 2005.

Jesuit education
Jesuit development centres
Organizations established in 1955
International educational charities
1955 establishments in Venezuela
Education in Venezuela